Jacob Stephen "Jake" Varner (born March 24, 1986) is an American wrestler. Varner won the gold medal in the 96 kg category at the 2012 Summer Olympics in freestyle wrestling.

Varner wrestled collegiately for the Iowa State University Cyclones. He was a four-time NCAA Division I finalist and two-time NCAA Division I champion (junior and senior). In high school, he was also a two-time California wrestling state champion for Bakersfield High School in Bakersfield, California, where was coached by his uncle Andy, who served as head coach, and his father Steve, who served as an assistant. Varner has been an assistant wrestling coach at Penn State since 2016.

In 2022, Varner was inducted into the National Wrestling Hall of Fame as a Distinguished Member.

See also
List of Pennsylvania State University Olympians

References

External links
 
 bio on themat.com

1986 births
Living people
Sportspeople from Bakersfield, California
American male sport wrestlers
Iowa State Cyclones wrestlers
Wrestlers at the 2011 Pan American Games
Wrestlers at the 2012 Summer Olympics
Olympic gold medalists for the United States in wrestling
Medalists at the 2012 Summer Olympics
World Wrestling Championships medalists
Pan American Games medalists in wrestling
Pan American Games gold medalists for the United States
Medalists at the 2011 Pan American Games
20th-century American people
21st-century American people